"Lisa on Ice" is the eighth episode of the sixth season of the American animated television series The Simpsons. It was the first broadcast on the Fox network in the United States on November 13, 1994. In the episode, Lisa discovers that she possesses a skill for ice hockey. A rivalry between her and Bart ensues.

The episode was written by Mike Scully and directed by Bob Anderson. Anderson's passion for hockey is what inspired the plot. It features cultural references to films such as Rollerball and The Pope of Greenwich Village. The episode was well-received by critics and acquired a Nielsen rating of 11.6.

Plot
Principal Skinner gathers Springfield Elementary School students at an assembly to announce which subjects they are failing. To her horror, straight-A student Lisa discovers she is failing gym class. When she appeals to her gym teacher, they reach a compromise: Lisa will get a passing grade if she joins a sports program outside of school. She attempts to join several, but fails, which devastates her self-esteem.

Later, the family watches Bart play hockey for his team, the Mighty Pigs, coached by Chief Wiggum. After the game, Bart ridicules his sister for being poor at sports and uses his hockey stick to pelt her with litter. After watching Lisa deflect the litter and catch hockey pucks, Apu, the coach of the Kwik-E-Mart Gougers, thinks she would be a natural and makes her his team's goalie. Lisa excels as goalie and leads her team to its best season ever.

Encouraged by Homer playing favorites, a sibling rivalry develops between Bart and Lisa. It peaks when the town learns that the Gougers will face the Mighty Pigs at their next match. The game is viciously fought, with Bart and Lisa playing their best. With four seconds left, Bart is tripped by Jimbo, giving him a penalty shot against Lisa that will decide the game. As they face off, Bart and Lisa remember the good times they had together when they were younger. After they throw aside their equipment and hug, the match ends in a tie — much to Marge's pride and Homer's distress. Dissatisfied with the outcome, the residents of Springfield riot and trash the arena.

Production

The idea for the episode came from The Simpsons writer Mike Scully, who wanted to do an episode involving ice hockey because of his passion for the sport. Bob Anderson, who also had a small interest in hockey, directed the episode. To better familiarize himself with the sport, Anderson ordered a batch of VHS highlight tapes, watched the NHL playoffs for the first time, and made several trips to scout youth games, taking notes on how players looked stickhandling and shooting.

In his original draft of the episode, Scully had written cameos for Bobby Orr and Wayne Gretzky but, he explained, "they wound up falling out of the story, because we had such a good story with the family." Gretzky eventually ended up appearing in the Season 28 episode "The Nightmare After Krustmas", becoming the first hockey player to guest on the show.

The episode starts out with Lisa tricking Bart into believing it is a snow day by throwing a snowball at him which she made out of the ice in the fridge. The scene was inspired by Scully, who as a child loved to sit and listen by the radio waiting to see if there was going to be a school snow day. Scully thought, because of his experience as a child, that there was nothing more disappointing than to wake up expecting a snow day, only to find out there was no snow. The academic alerts the Springfield Elementary School students receive were based on those Scully received in junior high. The scene where Milhouse was bound by his hands and legs to the net was inspired by stories Scully had heard about Springfield Indians owner Eddie Shore tying his players to the posts "trying to teach his goalies to stay in the crease." Lisa's line, "Hack the bone! Hack the bone!" was inspired by ex–Springfield Kings backstop Billy Smith.

Although there was an emphasis on detail for the show, one mistake Scully regrets is having the game clock running (and eventually expiring) on Bart’s penalty shot. The clock would be paused in a normal hockey game until the shot was taken.

Cultural references

 Kent Brockman's line about a Garry Trudeau musical revue about Ronald Reagan is a reference to Rap Master Ronnie, an off-Broadway play about the Reagan administration that ran throughout the 1980s.
 When Moe visits Bart and Lisa at the Simpson house to see if they have any injuries that may affect the odds of the upcoming game, Marge sends him away as he pleads, "They're gonna take my thumbs". This is a reference to Eric Roberts' line, "Charlie, they took my thumb", from the 1984 film The Pope of Greenwich Village.
 The episode features several references to the 1975 film Rollerball.
 At the academic alerts assembly, bully Kearney has Dolph taken a memo on an Apple Newton, a personal digital assistant. When Dolph writes "Beat up Martin" on the screen, the handwriting recognition turns it into "Eat up Martha", and Kearney throws the Newton at Martin instead, referencing the MessagePad's poor handwriting recognition.

Reception

Critical reception
Since airing, the episode has received mostly positive reviews from television critics. The authors of the book I Can't Believe It's a Bigger and Better Updated Unofficial Simpsons Guide, Warren Martyn and Adrian Wood, called it "a fabulous episode for Lisa and Bart, although with a special mention for a few seconds of tremendous Edna Krabappel wickedness". DVD Verdict's Ryan Keefer said the episode "is one of the few episodes centered on Lisa that I enjoy watching", and gave it a B+ grade. DVD Talk's Aaron Beierle said, "there are definitely some funny moments in this episode, the sweet-natured way that the episode ends never sat right with me". ESPN.com named the episode the fifth best sports moment in the history of the show. The Orlando Sentinels Gregory Hardy listed it as the seventh-best episode of the show with a sports theme.

TV Squad's Adam Finley gave the episode a positive review, commenting that it is "a skewering of parents who become too involved in their children's sports and turn what should be a lesson in teamwork, trying your hardest, and losing gracefully into a kind of Roman Coliseum where grown adults live out violent fantasies and their own failed ambitions through their children". He added, "Homer is an absolute jerk in this episode, taunting his children when they lose and praising them when they win and humiliate their sibling" and "it's not just Homer. Marge, characteristically so, tries to remain diplomatic, but even she starts screaming for blood when Bart is tripped by an opposing player."

Ratings
In its original broadcast, "Lisa on Ice" finished 34th in the ratings for the week of November 7 to November 13, 1994, with a Nielsen rating of 11.6. It was the second-highest-rated show on the Fox network that week.

References

External links

The Simpsons (season 6) episodes
1994 American television episodes
Ice hockey mass media
Physical fitness in popular culture

fi:Simpsonit (6. tuotantokausi)#Lisan liukkaat (Lisa on Ice)